Gegè Bellavita is a 1978 Italian commedia all'italiana film directed by Pasquale Festa Campanile.

Cast 
 Flavio Bucci as Gennarino Amato 
 Lina Polito  	as Agatina 
 Enzo Cannavale as Gennarino's Friend 
 Marisa Laurito as Carmen 
 Pino Caruso  as Duke Attanasi 
 Maria Pia Conte as Mercedes 
 Miranda Martino as Rosa
 Marina Hedman as Chantal, Attanasi's wife
 Maria Baxa as Signora Sciscioni

References

External links

1978 films
Italian comedy films
1978 comedy films
Films directed by Pasquale Festa Campanile
Films scored by Riz Ortolani
1970s Italian films